Pitcairnia hintoniana is a plant species in the genus Pitcairnia. This species is endemic to Mexico.

References

hintoniana
Flora of Mexico